Hubert Baxter Scudder (November 5, 1888 – July 4, 1968) was an American politician who served as a U.S. representative from California from 1949 to 1959.

Early life and education
Born in Sebastopol, California, Scudder graduated from the public schools, supplemented by correspondence courses, night schools, and the reading of law. He became superintendent of utilities for the city of Sebastopol from July 1, 1912, to November 4, 1920. He served in the United States Coast Artillery from May to December 1918. He became involved in the insurance and real estate business in November 1920.

Political career
Scudder was elected city councilman of Sebastopol in April 1924 and mayor in 1926. He was elected to and served as a member of the California State Assembly from January 1925 to January 1940. He was appointed real estate commissioner of the State of California in January 1943 and resigned March 1, 1948. He served as president of the National Association of License Law Officials from November 1947 to September 1948.

Scudder was elected as a Republican to the Eighty-first and to the four succeeding Congresses (January 3, 1949 – January 3, 1959). Scudder voted in favor of the Civil Rights Act of 1957. He did not run for re-election in 1958.

Post-congressional career and death
After Congress, he returned to the real estate and insurance business. He died in Sebastopol, California, on July 4, 1968. He was interred in Sebastopol Cemetery.

References

External links

Join California Hubert B. Scudder

1888 births
1968 deaths
United States Army personnel
California city council members
Mayors of places in California
Republican Party members of the California State Assembly
Republican Party members of the United States House of Representatives from California
People from Sebastopol, California
20th-century American politicians